The 2003 National Pro Fastpitch season was the final year before the Women's Pro Softball League (WPSL) relaunched with league play in 2004.  In November 2002, WPSL announced that it was taking a new name, National Pro Fastpitch, and that it would spend 2003 as a year of touring before resuming competitive play.   From 1997 to 2002, the league operated under the names Women's Pro Fastpitch (WPF) and Women's Pro Softball League (WPSL).

The All-Star tour lineup visited 17 cities and partnered with a dozen Major League Baseball Clubs (Arizona Diamondbacks, Atlanta Braves, Boston Red Sox, Cincinnati Reds, Chicago White Sox, Colorado Rockies, Detroit Tigers, Florida Marlins, Houston Astros, Milwaukee Brewers, Minnesota Twins, and San Francisco Giants) for exhibition fastpitch games against local fastpitch teams, clinics and promotions.

After the tour, NPF held tryout camps, and their franchises conducted drafts to stock their rosters for the 2004 season.

Schedule

Roster
The roster of the 2003 NPF All-Star softball team is listed below:

Head coach Tim Kiernan

Assistant coach Trina Salcido

References

External links

See also

 List of professional sports leagues
 List of professional sports teams in the United States and Canada

Softball teams
2003 in women's softball
Softball in the United States
2003 in American women's sports